Nicholas Jamaal Chubb (born December 27, 1995) is an American football running back for the Cleveland Browns of the National Football League (NFL). He played college football at Georgia and was drafted by the Browns in the second round of the 2018 NFL Draft. Chubb has been named to four Pro Bowls during his NFL career.

Early years
Chubb attended Cedartown High School in Cedartown, Georgia, where he was a two-sport star for the Bulldogs’ football and track teams. In football, he led the state of Georgia in rushing yards with 2,721 with 38 touchdowns as a junior. As a senior, he had 2,690 yards and 41 touchdowns. He finished his high school career with 6,983 rushing yards and 102 rushing touchdowns.

As a standout track & field athlete, Chubb competed from 2011 to 2015 in events ranging from the 100-meters to the shot put. At the 2013 4A Sectionals, he took fifth place in the long jump event with a leap of 6.85 meters (22 ft, 4 in). At the 2014 4A Sectionals, he won the shot put event, recording a top-throw of 17.05 meters (55 ft, 8in), and earned second-place finishes in both the 100-meter dash, with a time of 10.69 seconds (setting a school record) and the 200-meter dash, with a time of 21.83 seconds. He captured the state title in the shot put at the 2014 Class AAAA with a throw of 16.77 meters (55 ft).

Chubb was ranked by both Rivals.com and Scout.com as a four-star recruit. In June 2013, he committed to the University of Georgia to play college football under head coach Mark Richt.

College career

Chubb entered his true freshman season as a backup to starter and future NFL running back Todd Gurley. After Gurley was suspended, Chubb took over as the starter. In his first start, he rushed for 143 yards on 38 carries at Missouri. The next game, he rushed for 202 yards and two touchdowns on 30 carries against Arkansas. In the 2014 Belk Bowl against Louisville, Chubb broke the bowl game record with 266 rushing yards and was named the Belk Bowl MVP. Chubb finished his freshman season with 1,547 rushing yards, good for second in the SEC, despite starting just eight games.

At the Alabama game on October 3, 2015, he tied Herschel Walker's record of 13 consecutive 100-yard games. However, on October 10, 2015, Chubb suffered a "grotesque" knee injury against Tennessee, preventing him from surpassing the record. Due to that injury, he missed the rest of the 2015 season but returned for the 2016 season under new head coach Kirby Smart.

Chubb returned in the Chick-fil-A Kickoff Game, rushing for 222 yards and two touchdowns in a victory over #22 North Carolina. After two modest performances in narrow victories, Chubb sprained his ankle against Ole Miss and was used sparingly over the next five games. Georgia went 1–4 in that period, the sole victory coming over South Carolina behind Chubb's 121 yards and two touchdowns (along with Sony Michel's 133 yards). Chubb split carries with Michel for the remaining four games of the regular season, but had 100+ yards in two anyway, and ended 2016 with 142 yards and a game-sealing touchdown over TCU in the Liberty Bowl. He also passed former backfield partner Todd Gurley for second all-time in school rush yards. Chubb also passed Kevin Faulk and Darren McFadden to become second in all-time SEC rushing yards, trailing only fellow bulldog Herschel Walker—who was voted the greatest college football player of all time by FBS coaches—in this category.

It was thought that Chubb would enter the 2017 NFL Draft, but he decided to return in 2017 for his senior season with the Bulldogs. During his senior campaign, Chubb split carries with Sony Michel, but still managed to amass 1,345 yards on 223 carries (6.0 average) with 15 touchdowns. The two led Georgia to a 12–1 record and an SEC title. In a double-overtime victory over Oklahoma in the Rose Bowl in the College Football Playoff semifinal, Chubb had 145 yards on 14 carries, including a 50-yard touchdown just after halftime and a game-tying 2-yard run in the last minute of regulation. (Previously that season, Chubb eclipsed 125 yards and two touchdowns three other times: against Samford, Vanderbilt, and Kentucky.) In the national championship game, Alabama's suffocating defense held Chubb to just 25 yards on 18 carries in the 26–23 overtime loss.

College statistics

Professional career

Chubb was drafted by the Cleveland Browns in the second round with the 35th overall pick in the 2018 NFL Draft. He was the fourth running back to be selected that year.

2018 season
On June 4, 2018, Chubb signed a four-year rookie deal worth about $7.4 million. The contract included a $3.4 million signing bonus.

Playing behind veterans Carlos Hyde and Duke Johnson, he made his NFL debut in a season-opening 21–21 tie with the Pittsburgh Steelers where he had three carries for 21 yards. With just four carries for 20 yards in the next two games, Chubb made the most of his three carries in a Week 4 45–42 overtime loss to the Oakland Raiders with touchdowns of 63 and 41 yards. Chubb was the fourth player in NFL history to break 100 rushing yards on three or fewer carries. On October 19, after the Browns traded Carlos Hyde to the Jacksonville Jaguars, Chubb was named the full-time starter. On November 11, Chubb broke off a 92-yard rushing touchdown to help the Browns secure a 28–16 victory over the Atlanta Falcons. Chubb's run was the longest rushing touchdown in Browns franchise history. He finished the game with 20 carries for 176 yards and one touchdown to go along with three receptions for 33 yards and the first receiving touchdown of his career.

Chubb finished his rookie year with 192 carries for 996 rushing yards and eight touchdowns (third among rookies in both categories to Saquon Barkley and Phillip Lindsay) along with 20 receptions for 149 receiving yards and two touchdowns.

2019 season

During Week 2 against the New York Jets, Chubb rushed 18 times for 62 yards and his first rushing touchdown of the season in the 23–3 victory. Two weeks later against the Baltimore Ravens, he ran for 165 rushing yards and a career high three touchdowns in the 40–25 victory. Chubb was named AFC Offensive Player Of The Week. During Week 6 against the Seattle Seahawks, he rushed 20 times for 122 yards and two touchdowns in the 32–28 loss, moving to second in the league in rushing. After a Week 7 bye, Chubb had 131 yards but two lost fumbles in a 27–13 loss to the New England Patriots in Week 8. During Week 12 against the Miami Dolphins, he rushed 21 times for 106 yards and a touchdown and caught three passes for 58 yards in the 41–24 win. Chubb's 92 rushing yards against the Pittsburgh Steelers in Week 11 were enough to move him past Christian McCaffrey for the league lead. During Week 14, Chubb had his sixth 100-yard game with 106 yards (99 of them in the second half) in the 27–19 win over the Cincinnati Bengals. In the next game against the Arizona Cardinals, he finished with 127 rushing yards and a 33-yard touchdown in the 24–38 loss. He earned his first Pro Bowl nomination for his 2019 season.

Chubb finished his second season with 1,494 rushing yards and eight touchdowns along with 36 receptions for 278 yards. His 1,494 rushing yards were the second-highest behind Derrick Henry, who rushed for 1,540 yards.  He was ranked 36th by his fellow players on the NFL Top 100 Players of 2020.

2020 season
In Week 2 against the Cincinnati Bengals, Chubb recorded 22 carries for 124 rushing yards and two rushing touchdowns in the 35–30 victory on Thursday Night Football. During Week 3 against the Washington Football Team, Chubb finished with 108 rushing yards and two touchdowns as the Browns won 34–20. In Week 4 against the Dallas Cowboys, Chubb suffered an MCL injury. The Browns placed him on injured reserve on October 5, 2020. Chubb was activated from injured reserve on November 14, 2020. In Week 10 against the Houston Texans, in his first game back from injury, Chubb recorded 19 carries for 126 rushing yards and a rushing touchdown, and sealed the win for the Browns with a 59-yard run late in the fourth quarter.
In Week 11 against the Philadelphia Eagles, Chubb recorded 20 carries for 114 rushing yards during the 22–17 win. In Week 12, against the Jacksonville Jaguars, he had 19 carries for 144 rushing yards and one rushing touchdown in the 27–25 victory. In Week 14, against the Baltimore Ravens, he had 17 carries for 82 rushing yards and two rushing touchdowns in the 47–42 loss on Monday Night Football. In Week 17, Nick Chubb eclipsed 1,000 yards for the season and became the first Browns running back to run for a touchdown of 40 yards or more against the Pittsburgh Steelers since Jim Brown in 1958. He earned a second Pro Bowl nomination for his performance in the 2020 season. He finished the 2020 season with 1,067 rushing yards and 12 rushing touchdowns.

In the Wild Card Round against the Pittsburgh Steelers, Chubb totaled 145 yards on 22 touches, including a 40-yard touchdown catch in the fourth quarter that broke the game open and stopped any chances of a Steelers comeback. The Browns would go on to win 48–37.  He was ranked 26th by his fellow players on the NFL Top 100 Players of 2021.

2021 season
On July 31, 2021, Chubb signed a three-year, $36.6 million contract extension with the Browns.  He scored two touchdowns in the Browns' season-opening loss to the Kansas City Chiefs. In Week 5, against the Los Angeles Chargers, he had 21 carries for 161 yards and a touchdown in the 47–42 loss. After missing two games, he had 14 carries for 137 rushing yards and two touchdowns in a 41–16 victory over the Cincinnati Bengals. Chubb tested positive for COVID-19 and was out the following game against the Patriots. He returned the following week and had 22 carries for 130 yards in a 13–10 victory over Detroit. In Week 16, against the Green Bay Packers, he had 184 scrimmage yards in the 24–22 loss.

On December 20, 2021, Chubb was one of five Cleveland Browns players selected to the NFL Pro Bowl. Chubb finished the 2021 season with 1,259 rushing yards and eight rushing touchdowns to go along with 20 receptions for 174 receiving yards and one receiving touchdown. Chubb finished second in the NFL in rushing yards. He was ranked 33rd by his fellow players on the NFL Top 100 Players of 2022.

2022 season
Chubb started the 2022 season strong with 22 carries for 141 rushing yards in a 26–24 win over the Carolina Panthers. The following week, he had three rushing touchdowns in a 31–30 loss to the New York Jets. Chubb scored a late touchdown to give the Browns a 13-point lead, but a series of miscues by the Browns led to the eventual comeback by the Jets. In Week 3, against the Pittsburgh Steelers, Chubb had 23 carries for 113 rushing yards and a touchdown in the 29–17 win. In Week 4, against the Atlanta Falcons, he had 19 carries for 118 rushing yards and one rushing touchdown in the 23–20 loss. In Week 5, against the Los Angeles Chargers, he had 17 carries for 134 rushing yards and two rushing touchdowns in the 30–28 loss.

NFL career statistics

Regular season

Postseason

Personal life
Chubb is named for his great-grandfather, one of eight brothers who founded Chubbtown, Georgia, a settlement of free blacks which endured through the American Civil War. His older brothers Henry and Zach played cornerback for Troy University and defensive back for Air Force, respectively. His father Henry played at Valdosta State, and his uncle Aaron was a linebacker for Georgia. His cousin Bradley Chubb plays for the Miami Dolphins, while another cousin Brandon Chubb was an undrafted free-agent signing who has been on multiple NFL rosters.

References

External links

 
 Georgia Bulldogs bio
 Cleveland Browns bio

1995 births
Living people
People from Cedartown, Georgia
Sportspeople from the Atlanta metropolitan area
Players of American football from Georgia (U.S. state)
American football running backs
Georgia Bulldogs football players
Cleveland Browns players
American Conference Pro Bowl players
Ed Block Courage Award recipients